Nikolai Girshevich Kapustin (22 November 19372 July 2020) was a Soviet composer and pianist of Russian-Jewish descent. He played with early Soviet jazz bands such as the Oleg Lundstrem Orchestra. In his compositions, mostly for piano, he used a fusion of jazz and classical forms. He and other pianists recorded his works.

Early life 
Kapustin was born in Horlivka, Ukraine. When he was age four, with his father fighting in World War II, his mother and grandmother moved with him and his sister to the Kyrgyz city of Tokmak. He composed his first piano sonata at age 13. From age 14, Kapustin studied piano with Avrelian Rubakh (a pupil of Felix Blumenfeld, who also taught Simon Barere and Vladimir Horowitz). Beginning in 1954, he discovered jazz. His teacher supported his interest. Kapustin studied from 1956 with Alexander Goldenweiser at the Moscow Conservatory, graduating in 1961. He included Sergei Prokofiev's Piano Concerto No. 2 in his graduation recital.

Career 
During the 1950s, Kapustin acquired a reputation as a jazz pianist, arranger and composer. He had his own quintet, which performed at an "upscale restaurant" monthly. He played as a member of Yury Saulsky's big band and later in the Oleg Lundstrem Orchestra. In his compositions, he fused the traditions of both classical piano repertoire and improvisational jazz, combining jazz idioms and classical music structures. His Suite in the Old Style, Op. 28, written in 1977, sounds like jazz improvisation but is modeled after Baroque suites such as Johann Sebastian Bach's keyboard partitas. Other examples of his fusion music are 24 Preludes in Jazz Style, Op. 53, 24 Preludes and Fugues, Op. 82, written in 1997, and the Sonatina, Op. 100.

Kapustin regarded himself as a composer rather than a jazz musician: "I was never a jazz musician. I never tried to be a real jazz pianist, but I had to do it because of the composing. I'm not interested in improvisation – and what is a jazz musician without improvisation? All my improvisations are written, of course, and they became much better; it improved them."

Among his works are 20 piano sonatas, six piano concertos, other instrumental concertos, sets of piano variations, études and concert studies.

Record labels have released several recordings of the composer performing his own music.

Personal life 
Kapustin had two sons, one of whom is Anton Kapustin, a theoretical physicist.

Death 
Kapustin died on July 2, 2020, in Moscow from COVID-19. He was 82 years old.

References

External links 
 Schott Music, the official publisher of music of Nikolai Kapustin 
 
 
 Yana Tyulkova: Nikolai Kapustin (monograph) weiterlesen.de
 Onno van Rijen: Nikolai Kapustin, Internet edition July 2014 (archived)
 Sheet music by composer: Nikolai Kapustin tutti.co.uk
 

1937 births
2020 deaths
20th-century classical composers
20th-century classical pianists
20th-century Russian male musicians
21st-century classical composers
21st-century classical pianists
21st-century Russian male musicians
Jazz-influenced classical composers
Male classical pianists
Russian classical composers
Russian male classical composers
Russian classical pianists
Soviet composers
Soviet male composers
Soviet classical pianists
Ukrainian classical composers
Ukrainian classical pianists
People from Horlivka
Deaths from the COVID-19 pandemic in Russia